Alpha-mannosidase 2 is an enzyme that in humans is encoded by the MAN2A1 gene.

Function 

This gene encodes a protein which is a member of family 38 of the glycosyl hydrolases. The protein is located in the Golgi apparatus and catalyzes the final hydrolytic step in the asparagine-linked oligosaccharide (N-linked glycosylation) maturation pathway. Mutations in the mouse homolog of this gene have been shown to cause a systemic autoimmune disease similar to human systemic lupus erythematosus.

References

Further reading